Kenneth A. Ross Jr. (February 5, 1923 – April 27, 2004) served in the California State Assembly representing the 66th District from 1953 to 1955.  During World War II he served in the United States Navy.

References

External links

2004 deaths
United States Navy personnel of World War II
1923 births
20th-century American politicians
Republican Party members of the California State Assembly